Doriane Lambelet Coleman is a Swiss American law professor known for her work  on sex-segregated sports, transgender and intersex athletes. She is co-director of Duke Law's Center for Sports Law and Policy.

Early life and education
Coleman was born in a single parent family in Lausanne, Switzerland.

Coleman attended Villanova University, becoming one of the first women to receive a track scholarship there. She then transferred to Cornell where she received a Bachelor of Arts degree in 1982. As a college athlete she was the U.S. National Collegiate Indoor Champion in 1982, the U.S. National Indoor Champion (with her team) in the 4 x 400 meters relay in 1982. She moved to Switzerland after college and trained for the Swiss national team while working for the International Olympic Committee Museum in Lausanne. She was the Swiss National Champion in 1982 and 1983.

Legal career
Coleman attended Georgetown Law, where she was editor of the Georgetown Law Review. She earned her Juris Doctor degree from Georgetown in 1988. She worked at the law firm Wilmer, Cutler & Pickering. While there she helped develop the world's first random, out-of-competition drug-testing program for USA Track & Field. This got her involved in the Olympic Committee's anti-doping and eligibility efforts.

After her law firm work, she shifted to an academic and teaching career at Howard University School of Law and then took a job at Duke University. At Duke University, Coleman is the co-director of Duke Law's Center for Sports Law and Policy. She serves as a  member of the Advisory Council of the Kenan Institute for Ethics at Duke University as well as a Faculty Associate of the Trent Center for Bioethics, Humanities & History of Medicine at the Duke University School of Medicine, an Associate of the Duke Initiative for Science & Society, and an Affiliate of the Duke Center for Child and Family Policy.

Coleman is an advocate for protections for the LGBTQIA community in sports, wanting to secure protection for transgender athletes while also maintaining Title IX protections for female athletes. She has proposed an "accommodations approach" which creates multiple additional categories of athletes instead of simply having male and female categories. Transgender advocates find these proposals stigmatizing and unfair to transgender athletes. Coleman was the co-founder, with Martina Navratilova and others, of the Women's Sports Policy Working Group which has a mission "to find middle ground in the debate over the participation of transgender women in sports," and tries to address and resolve conflicting state laws regarding the inclusion of transgender athletes in women's sports. Coleman is no longer in a leadership position with the Women's Sports Policy Working Group.

Coleman condemned North Carolina's  H.B. 358, a bill that prevented transgender girls from participating in high school sports, for excluding transgender athletes and for drawing unfair conclusions from her research. Coleman was co-chair of the Duke Law's journal Law and Contemporary Problems when they published a special issue entitled "Sex in Law." The journal contained an essay by Kathleen Stock that many felt was transphobic and eight student editors resigned from the journal rather than be associated with the essay.

Her writing has appeared in many legal and medical journals including in the Columbia Law Review, the Duke Law Journal, the Georgetown Law Journal, the Notre Dame Law Review, the Cardozo Law Review, the William and Mary Law Review, Law & Contemporary Problems, the American Journal of Law and Medicine, the Journal of the American Medical Association, Pediatrics, the Journal of Law and the Biosciences, the American Journal of International Law Unbound, and the International Sports Law Review. She has written about the Olympic Movement and the complex problems of international and legal governance. She has also published works on the mature minor doctrine about whether minors can legally consent to medical treatment without parental consent or over parental objections  Her op-eds about women in sports have appeared in The Washington Post and The New York Times.

Publications
 Coleman, D., and D. Beskind. Torts: Doctrine and Process. Duke University Press, 2021.
 Coleman, D., and K. Dodge. Preventing Child Maltreatment: Community Approaches. Guilford Press, 2009.
 Coleman, D. Fixing Columbine: The Challenge to American Liberalism. Carolina Academic Press, 2002.

Personal life
Coleman lives in Durham, North Carolina and is married to attorney and law professor James Earl Coleman. They have two children.

References

Living people
Cornell University alumni
Duke University School of Law faculty
Georgetown University Law Center alumni
Year of birth missing (living people)